KZGU, (99.5 FM), branded as 99.5 Guam Shark is a radio station broadcasting a Caribbean music format with local Reggae content. Licensed to Mangilao, Guam, the station is currently owned by Sorensen Pacific Broadcasting Inc.

History 
The station was assigned the KPXP call letters by the Federal Communications Commission on July 12, 1991. The station changed to its current KZGU call sign on April 21, 2014, coinciding with its move to Guam from the Northern Mariana Islands. At the same time, the former KRSI became KPXP, retaining the Power 99 name and format despite being on 97.9 MHz.

References

External links
 Guam Shark Official Website
 
 

ZGU
Radio stations established in 1991
1991 establishments in the Northern Mariana Islands
Reggae, soca and calypso radio stations
Radio stations in the Northern Mariana Islands